The 1943 Texas Longhorns football team represented the University of Texas at Austin during the 1943 college football season. Before the season began, Tom Landry left the Longhorns and joined the Army Air Corps.

Schedule

Awards and honors
 Joe Parker, Cotton Bowl co-Most Valuable Player

References

Texas
Texas Longhorns football seasons
Southwest Conference football champion seasons
Texas Longhorns football